Douglas Heye Dieken (born February 12, 1949) is a retired left tackle and radio color analyst for  the Cleveland Browns of the National Football League (NFL).  From 1971-2022, he had 51 years of association with the Browns in various capacities -  14 seasons as an active player (1971-1984), radio analyst for 34 seasons (between two stints: 1985-1995, 1999-2022), and an ambassador/spokesman during the team's three seasons of inactivity (1996-1998).

Playing career
In high school, Doug was a tight end, defensive end and punter. He caught 80 career passes, was a two-time North Central Illinois Conference First-team selection and was named to the All-State Team in 1966 by the Champaign News-Gazette. In college, he was a tight end on an Illinois team that hardly passed at all, and so he was not taken until the sixth round of the 1971 draft. His first game in a Browns uniform was an exhibition game against the Chicago Bears that happened to be the game used as a backdrop for the movie Brian's Song which was released in November 1971. After improving rapidly during his first year with the Browns, the coaches seemed to think he could take over for left tackle Dick Schafrath.  He did, and became only the third left tackle in the team's history.

Excellent at both run and pass blocking, Dieken proved to be an outstanding player and an iron man.  He not only went to the Pro Bowl, but he set team records with 194 straight starts and 203 consecutive games played. Doug also proved to be a fine citizen, winning the NFL Man of the Year Award following the 1982 season, and adding his name and efforts to a number of worthy Cleveland area charities.

Broadcasting career
Following his retirement after the 1984 season, Dieken became a color commentator on Browns radio broadcasts, a job he held through the 2021 season, when he announced his retirement. 

Combining his playing and broadcasting career, he had been a part of the Browns organization for 51 years – as a player from 1971 to 1984, a radio broadcaster from 1985 to 1995 and 1999 to 2022, and a spokesman/ambassador for the Cleveland Browns Trust during the team's "inactive" period from 1996 to 1998.

Awards and honors
1980 Pro Bowl selection
1982 Byron "Whizzer" White NFL Man of the Year Award
Inaugural winner of the Cleveland Touchdown Club Humanitarian Award (soon after renamed for Dieken)
1992 Greater Cleveland Sports Hall of Fame inductee 
2003 Ohio Broadcasters Hall of Fame inductee
Cleveland Browns Legends Club inductee (class of 2006)
2012 Greater Cleveland Sports Commission Lifetime Achievement Award
Radio booth at First Energy Stadium renamed the "Doug Dieken Radio Booth"
Football field at Streator High School was renamed Doug Dieken Stadium on September 2, 2022

References

External links

Cleveland Browns Honor Roll
Interview with Doug Dieken, recorded April 2, 2014, at the Cleveland Public Library's Sports Research Center by Dan Coughlin.

1949 births
Living people
People from Streator, Illinois
American football offensive tackles
Illinois Fighting Illini football players
Cleveland Browns players
Cleveland Browns announcers
American Conference Pro Bowl players
National Football League announcers